Spinning Song: Duck Baker Plays the Music of Herbie Nichols is an album by American guitarist Duck Baker, released in 1996. It was reissued in 2002.

The album consists of songs written by American jazz pianist and composer Herbie Nichols who wrote the standard "Lady Sings the Blues".

Reception

Music critic William York, writing for Allmusic, wrote of the album: "Nichols' compositions have their own sort of ambiguous, hard-to-pin-down harmonic aroma, filled with subtle harmonic twists and soft dissonances, but Baker somehow captures it in these versions even when he detours from the originals. He swings naturally and effortlessly when he wants, but he also takes things outside and gets abstract in his own quiet way... this album is a fine piece of work, one with the same type of subtlety and deceptive-sounding ease for which Nichols was/is known."

Track listing
All tracks composed by Herbie Nichols.

 "The Third World" – 4:02
 "The Happenings" – 4:34
"Lady Sings the Blues" – 5:16
"Nick at T's" – 4:46
"House Party Starting" – 5:21
"2300 Skiddoo" – 4:00
"Portrait of Ucha" – 4:06
"134th St." – 3:46
"Spinning Song" – 4:47

Personnel
Duck Baker – acoustic guitar

Production
John Zorn – producer
Kazunori Sugiyama – producer
Don Sternecker – engineer
Allan Tucker – mastering
Francis Wolff – photography
Ikue Mori – design

References

1996 albums
Duck Baker albums
Albums produced by John Zorn